The Quang Yen is a large coal field located in the north of Vietnam in Lào Cai Province. Quang Yen represents one of the largest coal reserves in Vietnam having estimated reserves of 3.3 billion tonnes of coal.

References 

Coal in Vietnam